Walter Thompson (born May 31, 1952, in West Palm Beach, Florida) is a composer, pianist, saxophonist, percussionist, and educator. He created the multidisciplinary live composing sign language, Soundpainting.

In 2001 Thompson won a Sebastià Gasch FAD Award for Soundpainting.

Collaborative work
Thompson has composed Soundpaintings with many contemporary orchestras in many cities around the world, including Barcelona, Paris, New York, Chicago, Los Angeles, Boston, Oslo, Berlin, Bergen, Lucerne, Copenhagen, and Reykjavik, among others, and has taught Soundpainting at the Conservatoire de Paris; Eastman School of Music; Iceland Academy of the Arts; University of Michigan; Grieg Academy in Bergen, Norway; University of Iowa; Oberlin College Conservatory of Music; and New York University, among many others.

Selected recordings
SP4tet – Dane Recordings (Mr. Thompson's Soundpainting string quartet).
New York Soundpainting Orchestra – with Soundpainter's Walter Thompson and Evan Mazunik – Dane Recordings (release TBA soon).
Six Soundpainting Compositions with Anthony Braxton, Walter Thompson and the Walter Thompson Orchestra (release TBA soon).
Walter Thompson/Olle Karlsson Duo – Dane Recordings.
PEXO 111004 DVD (Dane Records).
PEXO (CD) -A Soundpainting Symphony (Nine Winds Records).
Steve Rust Soundpainting Sextet – Walter Thompson Soundpainter – Dane Recordings.
Side Show Time – Walter Thompson Soundpainter – Dane Recordings.
Deconstructing Haydn – Walter Thompson Soundpainter, Gil Selinger soloist (Novodisc Recordings).
Code of The West-with Joe Gallant (Scratchy Records).
The Colonel (Nine Winds Records).
Not for Rollo (Ottava Records).
Various-John Zorn's Cobra (Knitting Factory Works).
520 OUT (Dane Records).
Symphony of the Universe-with Wendy Mae Chambers (Newport Classic).
Stardate (Dane Records).
ARC (Dane Records).
Four Compositions with Walter Thompson and Anthony Braxton (Dane Records).

Selected publications
Soundpainting Workbook 1 – The Art of Live Composing for Musicians (Level 1).
Soundpainting Workbook 2 - The Art of Live Composing for Musicians (Level 2).
Soundpainting Workbook 3 – The Art of Live Composing for Actors and Dancers (Levels 1 and 2).
Colors for Chorus – Boosey and Hawkes.
Introduction to Soundpainting – Eufonia Núm.047 (en Espagnol).

References

External links
Soundpainting website
The Walter Thompson Orchestra
Interview/Walter Thompson

20th-century composers
1952 births
Living people
People from West Palm Beach, Florida
Berklee College of Music alumni